Bassel El-Gharbawy (born 10 April 1977) is an Egyptian judoka. He competed at three Olympic Games. He is also well known for his judo academy by the name of SUA, achieving 40 medals in their last championship.

Achievements

References

External links

1977 births
Living people
Egyptian male judoka
Judoka at the 1996 Summer Olympics
Judoka at the 2000 Summer Olympics
Judoka at the 2004 Summer Olympics
Olympic judoka of Egypt
Mediterranean Games gold medalists for Egypt
Mediterranean Games silver medalists for Egypt
Mediterranean Games medalists in judo
Competitors at the 2001 Mediterranean Games
Competitors at the 2005 Mediterranean Games
African Games medalists in judo
African Games gold medalists for Egypt
Competitors at the 1999 All-Africa Games
20th-century Egyptian people
21st-century Egyptian people